Svartviks IF is a Swedish football club located in Kvissleby.

Background
Svartviks IF currently plays in Division 4 Medelpad which is the sixth tier of Swedish football. They play their home matches at the Stadium in Kvissleby.

The club is affiliated to Medelpads Fotbollförbund.

Season to season

In their most successful period Svartviks IF competed in the following divisions:

In recent seasons Svartviks IF have competed in the following divisions:

Footnotes

External links
 Svartviks IF – Official website

Sport in Västernorrland County
Football clubs in Västernorrland County
1894 establishments in Sweden